The Seattle Tower, originally known as the Northern Life Tower, is a 27-story skyscraper in downtown Seattle, Washington.  The building is located on 1218 Third Avenue and is known as Seattle's first art-deco tower. Its distinctive, ziggurat exterior is clad in 33 shades of brick designed to effect a gradient which lightens from the bottom to the top of the building.  This is said to have been inspired by local rock formations.

According to the US National Park Service website:

The building was added to the National Register of Historic Places in 1975 and is also a designated city landmark.

References

External links

 Seattle Tower, middle 20 minutes of a one-hour broadcast from KUOW, Seattle. An audio tour of the building and its history.

1920s architecture in the United States
Art Deco architecture in Washington (state)
Downtown Seattle
National Register of Historic Places in Seattle
Office buildings completed in 1929
Office buildings on the National Register of Historic Places in Washington (state)
Skyscraper office buildings in Seattle